BBL Churchill is a legal financing company that specializes in funding mid- to high-range divorce cases. Based in New York City, Churchill provides loans to individuals going through the divorce process. The loans cover the costs associated with their cases, including legal expenses, expert fees, and the cost of living during a case. Loans are not repayable until after the borrower's case is concluded. An interest rate is charged on the loan which is comparable that of a credit card.

BBL Churchill is currently run by CEO and Chairman Brendan Lyle, a former co-founder and general counsel of Impact Capital Limited.

References

External links
 BBL Churchill's official website

Financial services companies based in New York City